The Memorial is a 1932 English novel by author Christopher Isherwood. The novel tells the story of an English family's disintegration in the days following World War I. Isherwood's second published novel, this is the first of his works for which he adapted his own life experiences into his fiction.

Notes

1932 British novels
Novels by Christopher Isherwood
Hogarth Press books
Novels with gay themes